CTV National News is the flagship newscast of CTV News, the news division of the CTV Television Network, which airs at 11:00 pm local time on the CTV stations across Canada, and is produced from CTV's facilities at 9 Channel Nine Court in Scarborough, Toronto, Ontario. It also airs on CTV News Channel, CTV's 24-hour cable news television channel, live at 10:00 pm Eastern—or 11:00 Atlantic, when the newscast begins its nightly run across the network—with hourly repeats until 2:00 am Eastern (11:00 pm Pacific). The previous day's newscast can be seen on the Internet. 

The newscast is presented by Omar Sachedina since September 5, 2022 who succeeded longtime anchor Lisa LaFlamme while Sandie Rinaldo anchors the program's weekend broadcasts.

The program is also broadcast in High-Definition.

LaFlamme succeeded veteran anchor Lloyd Robertson during the second half of 2011, following Robertson's retirement. Substitute anchors include Rinaldo (for weekday broadcasts), Anne-Marie Mediwake, Todd van der Heyden, Joy Malbon, John Vennavally-Rao, Heather Butts, Heather Wright, Merella Fernandez and Jon Erlichman.

The title CTV National News was rarely used in the 1990s and early 2000s; weeknights, the program was called CTV News with Lloyd Robertson and on the weekends, CTV News with Sandie Rinaldo. The title CTV National News was reintroduced in 2008, because CTV News had become the name of both the national and local news on CTV owned-and-operated (O&O) stations, although the banner continues to bear the title CTV News.

The newscast ran for 20 minutes until it was expanded to a half-hour on September 5, 1988. Prior to 1992, the newscast ran a perennial second in national news ratings to CBC Television's The National. In that year, its ratings jumped significantly after the CBC's unsuccessful renaming of its newscast as Prime Time News. CTV National News became the top-rated newscast for the first time in its history.

Local newscasts are never broadcast nationally. Stories from local stations that have national importance are taken from the local O&O, and a 'national reporter' re-does the story, often from a location hundreds or even thousands of miles from the location of the story. The national reporter always mentions their name and location where they are based at the end of the story, even though that location is often different from the location of the story.

Until September 1998, CTV National News aired at midnight in the Maritime provinces. This was because CTV National News only produced one edition for the entire network, which aired live at 11:00 pm EST. When CTV Atlantic was purchased by Baton Broadcasting in 1997, one of the improvements was for CTV News to produce a second edition of the national newscast that would air in the Atlantic time zone at 11:00 pm. CTV National News moved to its new time in September 1998.

CTV National News is not the same as CTV Evening News, a title that appears in some national ratings reports and is sometimes erroneously associated with the 11:00 p.m. newscast. The Evening News is not a single newscast but the national aggregate of CTV O&Os' local 6:00 p.m. newscasts. (All networks have their O&Os' local newscasts aggregated for national ratings purposes.)

Anchors 

The program was launched as CTV World News in 1961 from the studios of CJOH in Ottawa. It was presented by three anchors: Charles Lynch, Peter Stursberg and Peter Jennings.

The anchor team changed a number of times over the first few years of broadcast, with Jennings as the sole constant. Other co-anchors included Baden Langton and Ab Douglas. Larry Henderson, the former host of The National, was the show's international affairs analyst and weekend anchor for several years.

In the 1962–63 season, struggling to compete with CBC's more established CBC National News, CTV moved its newscast to 10:30, scheduling a variety show, Network, for 10:55 p.m. The experiment lasted one season.

Jennings left for ABC News in 1964, and Harvey Kirck, Jennings' co-anchor since 1963, became the newscast's sole anchor.

In 1976, CTV National News scored a major coup by hiring Lloyd Robertson, anchor of CBC's The National, as co-anchor with Kirck.  When Kirck retired in 1984, Robertson became sole weekday anchor of the program, a position he held until 2011.

For a time in the late 1970s and again in the early 1990s, Keith Morrison acted as weekend and substitute anchor and was considered Robertson's likely successor before a network shakeup resulted in his moving to NBC News.  Since 1985 (except for a brief period from 1990 to 1991), Sandie Rinaldo has served as weekend anchor.

With a total of 40 years on two networks, Robertson was the second-longest tenured news anchor on English-language North American television (network or local), behind Dave Ward, who was the top anchorman at KTRK-TV in Houston, Texas from 1967 to 2017.  He was the longest-tenured network news anchor in North America, outlasting several long-standing anchors in the United States.  On October 18, 2006, Robertson celebrated his 30th year as a CTV National News anchor. (Jim Lehrer had presented The NewsHour with Jim Lehrer since its inception in 1975, beating Robertson by almost a year, but he only presented as a sole anchor of the programme from 1995 until 2011.)

On July 8, 2010, Robertson announced that he would retire on September 1, 2011—his 35th anniversary at CTV. The following day, CTV announced Lisa LaFlamme, the network's chief international correspondent and Robertson's backup anchor since 2003, had been named as Robertson's successor. LaFlamme formally took over the program on September 2, 2011. On August 15, 2022, it was announced by Bell Media and CTV that LaFlamme's contract was not being renewed by the network due to a "business decision" to take the newscast "in a different direction". Omar Sachedina assumed the role of chief news anchor and senior editor of CTV National News, as of September 5, 2022.

LaFlamme's departure from the newscast led to allegations that she was fired for having let her hair go grey during the COVID-19 pandemic. In particular, CTV News head Michael Melling faced scrutiny when it was revealed that he had asked in internal memos for an explanation of who had permitted LaFlamme to make that decision, and had sparred with LaFlamme over the costs involved in covering both the 2022 Russian invasion of Ukraine and the Platinum Jubilee of Elizabeth II. CTV denied the allegations that LaFlamme's age or hair colour had entered into the decision, and announced a workplace review.

Anchors
Charles Lynch (1961) (co-anchor)
Peter Stursberg (1961) (co-anchor)
Baden Langton (1962–1964) (co-anchor)
Ab Douglas (1962–1964) (co-anchor)
Peter Jennings (1961–1964) (co-anchor)
Harvey Kirck (1963–1984, chief anchor from 1964 to 1976, co-anchor 1963 to 1964 and 1976 to 1984)
Lloyd Robertson (1976–2011, co-anchor from 1976 to 1984, chief anchor from 1984 onward)
Sandie Rinaldo (1985–1989, 1991–present) (weekends)
Keith Morrison (1992–1995) (fill-in)
Lisa LaFlamme (2011–2022)
Omar Sachedina (2022–present) (Monday-Thursday)

See also
 CTV News

References

External links 
 CTV National News website
 

CTV Television Network original programming
1961 Canadian television series debuts
CTV News
1960s Canadian television news shows
1970s Canadian television news shows
1980s Canadian television news shows
1990s Canadian television news shows
2000s Canadian television news shows
2010s Canadian television news shows
2020s Canadian television news shows
Television series by Bell Media
Television shows filmed in Toronto
Flagship evening news shows